Netaji was a Tamil language weekly magazine published by the All India Forward Bloc in Tamil Nadu. The first copy was released on 23 January 1948, the birthday of Netaji Subhas Chandra Bose. The founder was Muthuramalinga Thevar.

Sources

Bose, K.; Forward Bloc. Madras: 1988, Tamil Nadu Academy of Political Science. p. 168.

1948 establishments in India
1948 disestablishments in India
All India Forward Bloc
Defunct magazines published in India
Defunct political magazines
Magazines established in 1948
Magazines disestablished in 1948
Memorials to Subhas Chandra Bose
Political magazines published in India
Tamil-language magazines
Weekly magazines published in India